Dheekshith Shetty is an Indian film and television actor who predominantly works in Kannada and Telugu films. He started his career through the TV show Preethi Endarenu. He made his feature film debut in K. S. Ashoka's 2020 film Dia.

Filmography

Television

Awards and nominations

References

External links
 
 

Living people
1991 births
Male actors in Kannada cinema
Male actors in Kannada television
Male actors in Telugu cinema
People from Udupi district
Indian male film actors
21st-century Indian male actors